The earliest known example of a Bible translation into Ajem-Turkic (also known as Middle Azeri) was made in the 17th century. A copy of it is being stored in the Uppsala University, Sweden.

The first modern Azerbaijani translation by Mirza Farrukh and Feliks Zaręba was the Gospel of Matthew, published in 1842 in London by Basel Missionary Society. The complete New Testament was fully translated and published in 1878 in London and the Old Testament in 1891. 

In 1982, the Institute for Bible Translation in Stockholm, Sweden released a new modern Azerbaijani language translation of the New Testament made by Mirza Khazar, which is currently used in Azerbaijan. Mirza Khazar's translation being reprinted five times in subsequent years.  The most recent New Testament edition, the sixth, is of 1998, while the Old Testament's one is of 2004. Mirza Khazar's translation of The Old Testament was completed in 1984, but not printed. 

Elam published an Iranian (Southern) Azeri translation in 2013.

Comparison

References

External links
interwiki Bibliyanın Azərbaycan dilinə tərcümələri
Bible.az (Bible in Azeri (Azerbaijani) )
YeniHeyat.com
azerincil.net
Sound Bible
İncil (Yeni dünya tərcüməsi) on www.jw.org (Official Website of Jehovah's Witnesses)

Azerbaijani
Azerbaijani literature
Christianity in Azerbaijan